Christopher Collier (born January 29, 1930; died March 6, 2020) was an American historian and fiction writer.

Collier was born in New York City. Christopher Collier, known as Kit, is the son of Edmund Collier, a writer, and Katherine Brown. He comes from a family of writers and teachers. He attended Clark University and Columbia University, (Ph.D. 1964). He was the official Connecticut State Historian (1984–2004) and professor of history emeritus at the University of Connecticut. Collier and his brother, the author James Lincoln Collier, have co-written novels, most of which are based on historic events.

Collier's children's books include My Brother Sam Is Dead (1974), which deals with the American Revolution, and was awarded a Newbery Honor, and seven historical novels written with James, including Jump Ship to Freedom (1981). His books for adults include Roger Sherman's Connecticut: Yankee Politics and the American Revolution; Decision in Philadelphia (with James); and All Politics is Local, about Connecticut's role in the 1787 Constitutional Convention.

References

External links
 

1930 births
2020 deaths
Columbia University alumni
Newbery Honor winners
Writers from New York City
Clark University alumni
University of Connecticut faculty
Historians of Connecticut
Novelists from Connecticut
20th-century American novelists
20th-century American historians
American male novelists
20th-century American male writers
Novelists from New York (state)
American male non-fiction writers
Historians from New York (state)